The 60th Street Branch of the Pennsylvania Railroad was a  branch line from South 58th Street in Philadelphia, Pennsylvania, to Hog Island, Pennsylvania. It was built in 1918 by the Philadelphia, Baltimore and Washington Railroad, a subsidiary of the PRR, and opened for service on August 20 of that year.

The line diverged from the PW&B's main line just north of Brill Interlocking, and bore southeast before curving southwest again.

Notes

Philadelphia, Baltimore and Washington Railroad lines
Pennsylvania Railroad lines

Closed railway lines in the United States